Sowmaeh-ye Olya or Sowmeeh-ye Olya may refer to:
 Sowmaeh-ye Olya, Maragheh
 Sowmaeh-ye Olya, Meyaneh